Michael Calisaan is a Filipino professional basketball player for the San Juan Knights of the Maharlika Pilipinas Basketball League (MPBL). He was selected 10th overall in the 2018 PBA draft by  Magnolia Hotshots.

Professional career

Magnolia Hotshots (2018–2020)
On December 16, 2018, Calisaan was selected with the tenth overall by the Magnolia Hotshots in the 2018 PBA draft.

PBA career statistics

As of the end of 2021 season

Season-by-season averages
 
|-
| align=left | 
| align="left" rowspan="2" | Magnolia
| 7 || 4.8 || .556 || .200 || .167 || 1.6 || .0 || .0 || .0 || 3.1
|-
| align=left | 
| 9 || 6.2 || .385 || .000 || .000 || 1.7 || .2 || .0 || .0 || 1.1
|-
| align=left | 
| align="left" | Phoenix
| 9 || 7.4 || .286 || .250 || .000 || 1.6 || .2 || .0 || .0 || 1.6
|-class=sortbottom
| align=center colspan=2 | Career
| 25 || 6.2 || .404 || .214 || .100 || 1.6 || .2 || .0 || .0 || 1.9

References

1995 births
Living people
Basketball players from Pampanga
Power forwards (basketball)
Small forwards
San Sebastian Stags basketball players
Magnolia Hotshots players
Magnolia Hotshots draft picks
Phoenix Super LPG Fuel Masters players
Filipino men's 3x3 basketball players
PBA 3x3 players
Maharlika Pilipinas Basketball League players